Medan International Airport may refer to:

 Kualanamu International Airport, Medan, Indonesia
 Soewondo Air Force Base, Medan, Indonesia, previously commercial international airport Polonia International Airport